Treachery on the High Seas, also known as Not Wanted on Voyage, is a 1936 British comedy crime film directed by Emil E. Reinert and starring Bebe Daniels, Ben Lyon and Charles Farrell. It is based on the play Murder in the Stalls by Maurice Messenger.

It was produced at British Lion's Beaconsfield Studios. The film's sets were designed by the art director Norman G. Arnold.

Synopsis
On a luxury liner some jewel thieves plan a major snatch.

Cast
 Bebe Daniels as May Hardy
 Ben Lyon as Johnny Hammond
 Charles Farrell as Logan
 Tom Helmore as Edward Brailstone
 Hay Petrie as Brainie
 Gordon McLeod as Fleming
 James Carew as Chief

References

External links

1936 films
1930s crime comedy films
British crime comedy films
Films set on ships
British black-and-white films
1936 comedy films
Films directed by Emil-Edwin Reinert
British Lion Films films
Films shot at Beaconsfield Studios
1930s English-language films
1930s British films